The 2022 Georgia Southern Eagles football team represented Georgia Southern University during the 2022 NCAA Division I FBS football season. The Eagles played their home games at Paulson Stadium in Statesboro, Georgia, and competed in the East Division of the Sun Belt Conference. The team was coached by Clay Helton, former head coach of the USC Trojans. Helton was hired on November 2, 2021, and this was his first season in Statesboro.

The team's statistical leaders include quarterback Kyle Vantrease.

Previous season

The Eagles finished the 2021 season  3–9, 2–6 in conference play, finishing last in the East Division.

Preseason

Recruiting class

|}
Source:

Media poll
The Sun Belt media days were held on July 25 and July 26. The Eagles were predicted to finish in fifth place in the Sun Belt's East Division. Georgia Southern also received 1-of-14 first place votes.

Sun Belt Preseason All-Conference teams

Defense

2nd team
Justin ellis – Defensive Lineman, 6th YR
Derrick canteen – Defensive Back, RS-JR

Special teams

2nd team
Anthony beck ii – Punter, RS-SR
Amare jones – All Purpose Back, 5th YR

Personnel

Schedule 
All conference games were announced March 1st, 2022.

Game summaries

Morgan State

at Nebraska

at UAB

Ball State

at Coastal Carolina

at Georgia State

No. 25 James Madison

at Old Dominion

Statistics

South Alabama

at Louisiana

Marshall

Appalachian State

Statistics

vs. Buffalo (Camellia Bowl)

Staff

References

Georgia Southern
Georgia Southern Eagles football seasons
Georgia Southern Eagles football